Atlas Herrion (born December 3, 1980 in Daphne, Alabama) is an American football offensive lineman who is a free agent. He was signed by the Green Bay Packers as an undrafted free agent in 2004. He played college football at Alabama.

Herrion has also been a member of the Cleveland Browns, Houston Texans and Philadelphia Soul.

External links
Arena Football League bio
Arizona Rattlers bio

1980 births
Living people
Players of American football from Alabama
American football offensive guards
Alabama Crimson Tide football players
Cleveland Browns players
Amsterdam Admirals players
Houston Texans players
Philadelphia Soul players
Arizona Rattlers players
San Jose SaberCats players
San Antonio Talons players
People from Daphne, Alabama
Green Bay Packers players